Sir Adrian Frederick Melhuish Smith, PRS (born 9 September 1946) is a British statistician who is chief executive of the Alan Turing Institute and president of the Royal Society.

Early life and education
Smith was born on 9 September 1946 in Dawlish. He was educated at Selwyn College, Cambridge, and University College London, where his PhD supervisor was Dennis Lindley.

Career
From 1977 until 1990, he was professor of statistics and head of department of mathematics at the University of Nottingham. He was subsequently at Imperial College, London, where he was head of the mathematics department. Smith is a former deputy vice-chancellor of the University of London and became vice-chancellor of the university on 1 September 2012. He stood down from the role in August 2018 to become the director of the Alan Turing Institute.

Smith is a member of the governing body of the London Business School. He served on the Advisory Council for the Office for National Statistics from 1996 to 1998, was statistical advisor to the Nuclear Waste Inspectorate from 1991 to 1998 and was advisor on Operational Analysis to the Ministry of Defence from 1982 to 1987.

He is a former president of the Royal Statistical Society. He was elected a Fellow of the Royal Society in 2001. His FRS citation included "his diverse contributions to Bayesian statistics. His monographs are the most comprehensive available and his work has had a major impact on the development of monitoring tools for clinicians."

In statistical theory, Smith is a proponent of Bayesian statistics and evidence-based practice—a general extension of evidence-based medicine into all areas of public policy. With Antonio Machi, he translated Bruno de Finetti's Theory of Probability into English. He wrote an influential paper in 1990 along with Alan E. Gelfand, which drew attention to the significance of the Gibbs sampler technique for Bayesian numerical integration problems. He was also co-author of the seminal paper on the particle filter (Gordon, Salmond and Smith, 1993).

In mathematics and statistics education, Smith led the team which produced the Smith Report on secondary mathematics education in the United Kingdom.

In April 2008, Smith was appointed as director general of science and research at the Department for Innovation, Universities and Skills (since merged with other departments to form the UK's BEIS). He took up his post in September 2008. His annual remuneration for this role is £160,000..

Smith was knighted in the 2011 New Year Honours. In 2023 he was a guest on The Life Scientific on BBC Radio 4.

Honorary doctorates

In 2011, Smith was awarded an Honorary Doctorate of Science from Plymouth University, in 2015, an Honorary Doctorate of Science from Ohio State University. and in 2020 an Honorary Doctorate Honoris Causa from Federal University of Rio de Janeiro. He also was awarded Honorary Doctorates from City University, University  of Loughborough, Queen Mary and University of London.

Bibliography

See also
 List of Vice-Chancellors of the University of London
 List of presidents of the Royal Society

References

External links
Making Mathematics Count (Smith report)
There is a photograph at "Adrian F M Smith" on the Portraits of Statisticians page

|-

|-

1946 births
Living people
Presidents of the Royal Statistical Society
Fellows of the Royal Society
Fellows of the American Statistical Association
British statisticians
20th-century British mathematicians
21st-century British mathematicians
Mathematics educators
Statistics educators
Vice-Chancellors of the University of London
People associated with Queen Mary University of London
Alumni of Selwyn College, Cambridge
Alumni of University College London
Academics of London Business School
Academics of Imperial College London
Bayesian statisticians
Knights Bachelor
People from Dawlish
Presidents of the Royal Society
Computational statisticians